Kfar Bin Nun (lit. The village of Bin-Nun) is a moshav in central Israel. Located in the Ayalon Valley, it falls under the jurisdiction of Gezer Regional Council.

History
The moshav was founded in 1952 by the Agricultural Union on the land of  the depopulated Palestinian village of al-Qubab.

It was initially  named Mishmar Ayalon Bet as it was located at the road junction to the existing Mishmar Ayalon, which had been established two years before, but was later renamed Kfar Bin Nun after Operation Bin Nun, which was named itself after the second name of Joshua (1:1), who fought here in the Ayalon valley (Joshua 10:12). During two efforts, IDF did not succeed to capture Latrun during the 1948 Arab–Israeli War.

Until the Six-Day War in 1967, it was classed as a border settlement, which meant it was entitled to financial compensation for the attacks it suffered due to its proximity to the Jordanian border.

References

External links

 Official website 

Moshavim
Agricultural Union
Populated places established in 1952
1952 establishments in Israel
Populated places in Central District (Israel)